Georg Cornelius Theodor von Georgievics (18. August 1859 Weißkirchen im Banat – 26. April 1933 Znaim) was an Austria-Hungary chemist.

Biography 
Georgievics studied at the Technical University Vienna and worked for a year in the textile company Marienthal.

He continued his study with  Zdenko Hans Skraup in Vienna and later with Carl Graebe at the  University of Genf. From 1886 on he was assistant of Hugo Weidel at the institute for pedology (soil chemistry) in Vienna. He received his Ph.D. from the University of Gießen in 1890 and worked as lecturer at the  Staatsgewerbeschulen Bielitz. He became professor at the German Charles-Ferdinand University in Prague in 1904. His area of research was based on dyes and dyeing processes.

Works 
 Monographie des Indigos, 1892
 Ausführliches Lehrbuch der Farbenchemie, 5. edition 1922
 Lehrbuch der chemischen Technologie der Gespinstfasern, 1917
 Farbe und Konstitution der Farbstoffe, 1920
 Handbuch des Zeugdruckes, together with R. Haller und L. Lichtenstein, 1929

References 
 
 
 Melliand Textilberichte 1935

1859 births
1933 deaths
Austrian chemists